The 2007–08 Ranji Trophy was the 74th season of the Ranji Trophy. Delhi defeated Uttar Pradesh by nine wickets in the final.

Group Matches

Ranji Trophy Super League

Group A

  Delhi and Saurashtra qualified for the knockout stage.

Group B

  Uttar Pradesh and Baroda qualified for the knockout stage.

Knockout Matches

Semifinal 1

Semifinal 2

Final

Scorecards and averages
Cricketarchive

References

External links

2008 in Indian cricket
Ranji Trophy seasons
Domestic cricket competitions in 2007–08